The Prime League was the reserve and youth team soccer league of Singapore's S.League. Teams involved in the league are primarily made up of youth players from the S.League clubs. The Prime League was founded in 1997. S.League clubs are required to participate, and clubs who do not play at S.League level are also eligible to enter. 

All S.League teams must register a minimum of 15 and a maximum of 20 players for the Prime League. Clubs not participating in the S. League register a minimum of 15 and a maximum of 25 players. The teams must maintain the minimum required number of players throughout the season.

Each club is allowed to register 1 foreign player for their Prime League teams. The foreign players must be aged between 18 and 21 at the point of registration and are not eligible to play in the S.League.

An S.League player who has played in his club's most recent S.League match is not eligible to play in the club's next Prime League match. 

Prime League sides also take part in the  FA Cup competition.

In 2018, the Prime League was scrapped with the National Football League (NFL) installed as the second-tier competition.

Past champions

Performance by Clubs

See also
 Singapore Premier League
 Singapore Cup
 Singapore League Cup
 Singapore FA Cup
 Singapore Community Shield
 List of football clubs in Singapore

References

External links
 Prime League overview at S.League website

 

R
Football leagues in Singapore
1997 establishments in Singapore
2017 disestablishments in Singapore